The 2015 USC Trojans football team represented the University of Southern California in the 2015 NCAA Division I FBS football season. USC played their home games at the Los Angeles Memorial Coliseum and were members of the South Division of the Pac-12 Conference. On November 30, 2015, Clay Helton was named USC's permanent head coach.

Personnel

Coaching staff

Roster

Returning starters
USC returns 31 starters in 2015, including fifteen on offense, twelve on defense, and four on special teams.

Key departures include Javorius 'Buck' Allen (TB – 13 games), Nelson Agholor (WR – 13 games), George Farmer (WR – 4 games), Randall Telfer (TE – 12 games), Aundrey Walker (OT), Leonard Williams (DE / DT – 13 games), J. R. Tavai (LB – 9 games), Hayes Pullard (LB – 12 games), Josh Shaw (CB / S – 2 games), Gerald Bowman (S – 10 games), Andre Heidari (K – 11 games).

Other departures : Ricky Town (QB – Freshman – Arkansas), Bryce Dixon (TE), Jalen Cope-Fitzpatrick (TE), Charles Burks (LB – Junior RS – Azusa Pacific), Rahshead Johnson (CB / S – Freshman – San Jose State), Lamont Simmons (CB – Freshman RS – Georgia Tech), Devian Shelton (CB – Sophomore RS), Peter McBride (SNP – Junior RS).

Offense (15)

Defense (12)

Special teams (4)

 : Co-Started in 2014

Depth chart

2015 USC Football Depth Chart

Freshman : Freshman

Double Position : #

Injured : +

Recruiting class

Scholarship distribution chart 

 /  / * : Former walk-on

– 85 scholarships permitted, 80 currently allotted to players (Note: Ricky Town is still "counts" for 2015, bringing the total to 81).

– 

– 

– With four blueshirts, USC can sign 20 players in the class of 2016.

2015 NFL draft

 * : Projected Round

Schedule

Game summaries

Arkansas State

   (Q1, 0:03) USC – #7 Steven Mitchell Jr. 14 yard pass from #6 Cody Kessler, (#39 Alex Wood kick) – USC 14–0
   (Q2, 9:38) USC – #23 Tre Madden 65 yard run, (#39 Alex Wood kick) – USC 21–0
   (Q2, 4:40) USC – #48 Taylor McNamara 2 yard pass from #6 Cody Kessler, (#39 Alex Wood kick) – USC28–0
   (Q3, 13:07) Arkansas State – #34 Michael Gordon 9 yard run – USC 28–6
   (Q3, 6:28) USC – #23 Tre Madden 8 yard pass from #6 Cody Kessler, (#39 Alex Wood kick) – USC 35–6
   (Q3, 3:46) USC – #25 Ronald Jones II 44 yard run, (#39 Alex Wood kick) – USC 42–6
   (Q4, 10:26) USC – #58 Osa Masina 46 yard fumble return, (#39 Alex Wood kick blocked) – USC 48–6
   (Q4, 4:21) USC – #28 Aca'Cedric Ware 6 yard run, (#39 Alex Wood kick) – USC 55–6

Idaho

   (Q1, 12:57) USC – #22 Justin Davis 1 yard run, (#39 Alex Wood kick) – USC 7–0
   (Q1, 09:28) USC – #22 Justin Davis 7 yard run, (#39 Alex Wood kick) – USC 14–0
   (Q1, 04:25) USC – #9 JuJu Smith-Schuster 50 yard pass from #6 Cody Kessler, (#39 Alex Wood kick) – USC 21–0
   (Q2, 15:00) Idaho – #5 Austin Rehkow 21 yard Field Goal – USC 21–3
   (Q2, 12:05) USC – #23 Tre Madden 7 yard run, (#39 Alex Wood kick) – USC 28–3
   (Q2, 05:48) USC – #23 Tre Madden 10 yard run, (#39 Alex Wood kick) – USC 35–3
   (Q2, 0:25) USC – #39 Alex Wood 24 yard Field Goal – USC 38–3
   (Q3, 09:41) Idaho – #13 Bobby Cowan 10 yard pass from #10 Matt Linehan – USC 38–9
   (Q3, 08:04) USC – #15 Isaac Whitney 28 yard pass from #6 Cody Kessler, (#39 Alex Wood kick) – USC 45–9
   (Q3, 03:53) USC – #9 JuJu Smith-Schuster 41 yard pass from #6 Cody Kessler, (#39 Alex Wood kick) – USC 52–9
   (Q4, 07:32) USC – #25 Ronald Jones II 1 yard run, (#39 Alex Wood kick) – USC 59–9

Stanford

   (Q1, 12:09) USC – #23 Tre Madden 1 yard run, (#39 Alex Wood kick) – USC 7–0
   (Q1, 02:55) STA – #18 Austin Hooper 15 yard pass from #8 Kevin Hogan, (#34 Conrad Ukropina kick) – USC 7–7
   (Q1, 01:00) USC – #7 Steven Mitchell Jr. 6 yard pass from #6 Cody Kessler, (#39 Alex Wood kick) – USC 14–7
   (Q2, 12:44) STA – #34 Conrad Ukropina 42 yard Field Goal – USC 14–10
   (Q2, 09:49) USC – #9 JuJu Smith-Schuster 54 yard pass from #6 Cody Kessler, (#39 Alex Wood kick) – USC 21–10
   (Q2, 04:21) STA – #22 Remound Wright 1 yard run, (#34 Conrad Ukropina kick) – USC 21–17
   (Q2, 00:03) STA – #89 Devon Cajuste 17 yard pass from #8 Kevin Hogan, (#34 Conrad Ukropina kick) – STA 24–21
   (Q3, 10:14) USC – #7 Steven Mitchell Jr. 1 yard pass from #6 Cody Kessler, (#39 Alex Wood kick) – USC 28–24
   (Q3, 04:59) STA – #22 Remound Wright 1 yard run, (#34 Conrad Ukropina kick) – STA 31–28
   (Q4, 11:25) STA – #22 Remound Wright 1 yard run, (#34 Conrad Ukropina kick) – STA 38–28
   (Q4, 9:25) USC – #39 Alex Wood 36 yard Field Goal – STA 38–31
   (Q4, 2:27) STA – #34 Conrad Ukropina 46 yard Field Goal – STA 41–31

Arizona State

   (Q1, 10:44) USC – #2 Adoree' Jackson 80 yard pass from #6 Cody Kessler, (#39 Alex Wood kick) – USC 7–0
   (Q2, 11:29) USC – #7 Steven Mitchell Jr. 27 yard pass from #6 Cody Kessler, (#39 Alex Wood kick) – USC 14–0
   (Q2, 03:44) USC – #9 JuJu Smith-Schuster 4 yard pass from #6 Cody Kessler, (#39 Alex Wood kick) – USC 21–0
   (Q2, 00:40) USC – #4 Chris Hawkins 94 yard fumble return, (#39 Alex Wood kick) – USC 28–0
   (Q2, 00:07) USC – #9 JuJu Smith-Schuster 10 yard pass from #6 Cody Kessler, (#39 Alex Wood kick) – USC 35–0
   (Q3, 02:05) ASU – #4 Demario Richard 1 yard run, (#5 Zane Gonzalez kick) – USC 35–7
   (Q4, 10:47) USC – #15 Isaac Whitney 10 yard pass from #6 Cody Kessler, (#39 Alex Wood kick) – USC 42–7
   (Q4, 07:48) ASU – #4 Demario Richard 4 yard run, (#5 Zane Gonzalez kick) – USC 42–14

Washington

   (Q1, 1:47) USC – #39 Alex Wood 34 yard Field Goal – USC 3–0
   (Q2, 9:54) WAS – #48 Cameron Van Winkle 21 yard Field Goal – USC 3–3
   (Q2, 0:00) USC – #39 Alex Wood 21 yard Field Goal – USC 6–3
   (Q3, 11:24) WAS – #82 Joshua Perkins 27 yard pass from #16 Marvin Hall, (#48 Cameron Van Winkle kick) – WAS 10–6
   (Q4, 14:21) WAS – #9 Myles Gaskin 1 yard run, (#48 Cameron Van Winkle kick) – WAS 17–6
   (Q4, 12:02) USC – #25 Ronald Jones II 1 yard run, (#6 Cody Kessler pass failed) – WAS 17–12

Notre Dame

   (Q1, 11:59) USC – #6 Cody Kessler 3 yard run, (#39 Alex Wood kick) – USC 7–0
   (Q1, 11:49) ND – #7 Will Fuller 75 yard pass from #14 DeShone Kizer, (#19 Justin Yoon kick) – 7–7
   (Q1, 8:52) USC – #39 Alex Wood 42 yard Field Goal – USC 10–7
   (Q1, 6:50) ND – #20 C. J. Prosise 25 yard run, (#19 Justin Yoon kick) – ND 14–10
   (Q1, 5:04) ND – #17 Kris Albarado punt blocked, #3 Amir Carlisle 5 yard run, (#19 Justin Yoon kick) – ND 21–10
   (Q2, 6:03) ND – #19 Justin Yoon 32 yard Field Goal – ND 24–10
   (Q2, 5:52) USC – #9 JuJu Smith-Schuster 75 yard pass from #10 Jalen Greene, (#39 Alex Wood kick) – ND 24–17
   (Q2, 3:31) USC – #2 Adoree' Jackson 83 yard pass from #6 Cody Kessler, (#39 Alex Wood kick) – 24–24
   (Q3, 9:45) USC – #48 Taylor McNamara 4 yard pass from #6 Cody Kessler, (#39 Alex Wood kick) – USC 31–24
   (Q4, 14:26) ND – #20 C.J. Prosise 4 yard run, (#19 Justin Yoon kick) – 31–31
   (Q4, 9:06) ND – #88 Corey Robinson 10 yard pass from #14 DeShone Kizer, (#19 Justin Yoon kick) – ND 38–31
   (Q4, 5:39) ND – #19 Justin Yoon 32 yard Field Goal – ND 41–31

Utah

   (Q1, 8:06) USC – #22 Justin Davis 9 yard run (#39 Alex Wood kick) – USC 7–0
   (Q1, 3:53) UTAH – #18 Britain Covey 30 yard pass from #7 Travis Wilson (#39 Andy Phillips kick) – 7–7
   (Q1, 1:49) UTAH – #8 Bubba Poole 2 yard run (#39 Andy Phillips kick) – UTAH 14–7
   (Q2, 9:47) USC – #31 Soma Vainuku 1 yard run (#39 Alex Wood kick) – 14–14
   (Q2, 3:40) USC – #25 Ronald Jones II 18 yard run (#39 Alex Wood kick) – USC 21–14
   (Q2, 1:07) USC – #35 Cameron Smith 54 yard interception run (#39 Alex Wood kick) – USC 28–14
   (Q2, 0:05) UTAH – #39 Andy Phillips 53 yard Field Goal – USC 28–17
   (Q3, 3:37) USC – #6 Cody Kessler 1 yard run (#39 Alex Wood kick) – USC 35–17
   (Q4, 9:58) USC – #9 JuJu Smith-Schuster 25 yard pass from #6 Cody Kessler (#39 Alex Wood kick) – USC 42–17
   (Q4, 4:00) UTAH – #18 Britain Covey 66 yard pass from #7 Travis Wilson (#39 Andy Phillips kick) – USC 42–24

California

   (Q1, 7:05) CAL – #1 Bryce Treggs 6 yard pass from #16 Jared Goff (#9 Matt Anderson kick) – CAL 7–0
   (Q2, 13:32) USC – #25 Ronald Jones II 13 yard run (#39 Alex Wood kick) – USC 7–7
   (Q2, 0:11) USC – #39 Alex Wood 22 yard Field Goal – USC 10–7
   (Q3, 9:50) USC – #23 Tre Madden 2 yard run, (#39 Alex Wood kick) – USC 17–7
   (Q3, 9:40) USC – #2 Adoree' Jackson 46 yard interception run (#39 Alex Wood kick) – USC 24–7
   (Q3, 5:46) CAL – #2 Daniel Lasco 6 yard run (#9 Matt Anderson kick) – USC 24–14
   (Q3, 1:47) USC – #39 Alex Wood 43 yard Field Goal – USC 27–14
   (Q4, 3:56) CAL – #89 Stephen Anderson 9 yard pass from #16 Jared Goff (#9 Matt Anderson kick) – USC 27–21

Arizona

   (Q1, 5:53) AZ – #6 Nate Phillips 9 yard pass from #12 Anu Solomon (#41 Casey Skowron kick) – AZ 7–0
   (Q2, 15:00) AZ – #4 David Richards 2 yard pass from #12 Anu Solomon (#41 Casey Skowron kick) – AZ 14–0
   (Q2, 11:39) USC – #39 Alex Wood 25 yard Field Goal – AZ 14–3
   (Q2, 9:25) USC – #9 JuJu Smith-Schuster 72 yard pass from #6 Cody Kessler (#39 Alex Wood kick) – AZ 14–10
   (Q2, 8:16) AZ – #41 Casey Skowron 37 yard Field Goal – AZ 17–10
   (Q2, 3:02) USC – #25 Ronald Jones II 5 yard pass from #6 Cody Kessler (#39 Alex Wood kick) – USC 17–17
   (Q3, 10:56) AZ – #41 Casey Skowron 41 yard Field Goal – AZ 20–17
   (Q4, 15:00) USC – #22 Justin Davis 9 yard run (#39 Alex Wood kick) – USC 24–20
   (Q4, 10:09) AZ – #41 Casey Skowron 44 yard Field Goal – USC 24–23
   (Q4, 9:37) USC – #25 Ronald Jones II 74 yard run (#39 Alex Wood kick) – USC 31–23
   (Q4, 2:42) USC – #22 Justin Davis 15 yard run (#39 Alex Wood kick) – USC 38–23
   (Q4, 0:16) AZ – #1 Cayleb Jones 1 yard pass from #12 Anu Solomon (#41 Casey Skowron kick) – USC 38–30

Colorado

   (Q1, 10:35) USC – #39 Alex Wood 22 yard Field Goal – USC 3–0
   (Q1, 5:15) COL – #23 Phillip Lindsay 4 yard run (#10 Diego Gonzalez kick) – COL 7–3
   (Q2, 9:28) COL – #22 Nelson Spruce 9 yard pass from #15 Cade Apsay (#10 Diego Gonzalez kick) – COL 14–3
   (Q2, 3:14) COL – #10 Diego Gonzalez 28 yard Field Goal – COL 17–3
   (Q2, 0:00) USC – #39 Alex Wood 41 yard Field Goal – COL 17–6
   (Q3, 5:34) USC – #38 Jahleel Pinner 4 yard pass from #6 Cody Kessler (#39 Alex Wood kick) – COL 17–13
   (Q3, 2:32) USC – #48 Taylor McNamara 2 yard pass from #6 Cody Kessler (#39 Alex Wood kick) – USC 20–17
   (Q4, 13:55) USC – #9 JuJu Smith-Schuster 36 yard pass from #6 Cody Kessler (#39 Alex Wood kick) – USC 27–17
   (Q4, 6:13) COL – #18 George Frazier 1 yard pass from #15 Cade Apsay (#10 Diego Gonzalez kick) – USC 27–24

Oregon

   (Q1, 7:34) ORE – #2 Bralon Addison 48 yard pass from #3 Vernon Adams (#41 Aidan Schneider kick) – ORE 7–0
   (Q1, 2:04) USC – #1 Darreus Rogers 27 yard pass from #6 Cody Kessler (#36 Matt Boermeester kick) – USC 7–7
   (Q1, 1:46) ORE – #81 Evan Baylis 52 yard pass from #3 Vernon Adams Jr. (#41 Aidan Schneider kick) – ORE 14–7
   (Q2, 12:20) USC – #82 Tyler Petite 12 yard pass from #6 Cody Kessler (#36 Matt Boermeester kick) – USC 14–14
   (Q2, 6:46) ORE – #7 Darren Carrington 37 yard pass from #3 Vernon Adams Jr. (#41 Aidan Schneider kick) – ORE 21–14
   (Q2, 2:47) ORE – #29 Kani Benoit 30 yard pass from #3 Vernon Adams Jr. (#41 Aidan Schneider kick) – ORE 28–14
   (Q2, 0:06) ORE – #41 Aidan Schneider 37 yard Field Goal – ORE 31–14
   (Q3, 11:33) ORE – #88 Dwayne Stanford 21 yard pass from #3 Vernon Adams Jr. (#41 Aidan Schneider kick) – ORE 38–14
   (Q3, 9:48) USC – #25 Ronald Jones II 12 yard run (#36 Matt Boermeester kick) – ORE 38–21
   (Q3, 1:48) USC – #2 Adoree' Jackson 41 yard punt return (#36 Matt Boermeester kick) – ORE 38–28
   (Q4, 12:57) ORE – #6 Charles Nelson 26 yard pass from #3 Vernon Adams Jr. (#41 Aidan Schneider kick) – ORE 45–28
   (Q4, 7:00) ORE – #41 Aidan Schneider 22 yard Field Goal – ORE 48–28

UCLA

   (Q1, 7:58) USC – #39 Alex Wood 30 yard Field Goal – USC 3–0
   (Q1, 3:32) UCLA – #24 Paul Perkins 19 yard run (#15 Ka'imi Fairbairn kick) – UCLA 7–3
   (Q2, 12:06) USC – #6 Cody Kessler 1 yard run (#39 Alex Wood kick) – USC 10–7
   (Q2, 9:49) UCLA – #18 Thomas Duarte 19 yard pass from #3 Josh Rosen (#15 Ka'imi Fairbairn kick) – UCLA 14–10
   (Q2, 2:51) USC – #39 Alex Wood 21 yard Field Goal – UCLA 14–13
   (Q2, 1:56) USC – #2 Adoree' Jackson 42 yard punt return (#39 Alex Wood kick) – USC 20–14
   (Q3, 8:42) UCLA – #24 Paul Perkins 1 yard run (#15 Ka'imi Fairbairn kick) – UCLA 21–20
   (Q3, 7:27) USC – #94 Rasheem Greene 31 yard fumble return, (2pts failed) – USC 26–21
   (Q3, 1:57) USC – #1 Darreus Rogers 21 yard pass from #6 Cody Kessler (#39 Alex Wood kick) – USC 33–21
   (Q4, 6:24) USC – #48 Taylor McNamara 8 yard pass from #6 Cody Kessler (#39 Alex Wood kick) – USC 40–21

Pac-12 Championship Game

   (Q1, 9:13) STA – #34 Conrad Ukropina 30 yard Field Goal – STA 3–0
   (Q2, 15:00) STA – #8 Kevin Hogan 11 yard pass from #5 Christian McCaffrey, (#34 Conrad Ukropina kick) – STA 10–0
   (Q2, 8:35) STA – #34 Conrad Ukropina 23 yard Field Goal – STA 13–0
   (Q2, 0:15) USC – #39 Alex Wood 40 yard Field Goal – STA 13–3
   (Q3, 11:56) USC – #38 Jahleel Pinner 1 yard pass from #6 Cody Kessler (#39 Alex Wood kick blocked) – STA 13–9
   (Q3, 5:28) USC – #25 Ronald Jones II 27 yard run (#39 Alex Wood kick) – USC 16–13
   (Q3, 3:16) STA – #8 Kevin Hogan 7 yard run (#34 Conrad Ukropina kick) – STA 20–16
   (Q3, 0:14) STA – #90 Solomon Thomas 30 yard fumble return, (#34 Conrad Ukropina kick) – STA 27–16
   (Q4, 12:35) USC – #6 Cody Kessler 12 yard run (2pts failed) – STA 27–22
   (Q4, 6:43) STA – #5 Christian McCaffrey 28 yard pass from #8 Kevin Hogan, (#34 Conrad Ukropina kick) – STA 34–22
   (Q4, 1:44) STA – #5 Christian McCaffrey 10 yard run – STA 41–22

Holiday Bowl

   (Q2, 13:34) WIS – #10 Rafael Gaglianone 28 yard Field Goal – WIS 3–0
   (Q2, 9:28) WIS – #6 Corey Clement 6 yard run (#10 Rafael Gaglianone kick) – WIS 10–0
   (Q2, 5:20) USC – #22 Justin Davis 1 yard run (#39 Alex Wood kick) – WIS 10–7
   (Q2, 0:30) WIS – #10 Rafael Gaglianone 33 yard Field Goal – WIS 13–7
   (Q3, 7:54) WIS – #2 Joel Stave 4 yard pass from #46 Austin Traylor, (#10 Rafael Gaglianone kick) – WIS 20–7
   (Q3, 5:38) USC – #22 Justin Davis 4 yard run (#39 Alex Wood kick) – WIS 20–14
   (Q4, 10:28) USC – #1 Darreus Rogers 7 yard pass from #6 Cody Kessler, (#39 Alex Wood kick) – USC 21–20
   (Q4, 2:31) WIS – #10 Rafael Gaglianone 29 yard Field Goal – WIS 23–21

Rankings

Statistics

Team

As of 11/22/2015.

Non-conference opponents

Pac-12 opponents

Offense

Defense

Key: POS: Position, SOLO: Solo Tackles, AST: Assisted Tackles, TOT: Total Tackles, TFL: Tackles-for-loss, SACK: Quarterback Sacks, INT: Interceptions, BU: Passes Broken Up, PD: Passes Defended, QBH: Quarterback Hits, FF: Forced Fumbles, FR: Fumbles Recovered, BLK: Kicks or Punts Blocked, SAF: Safeties, TD : Touchdown

Special teams

Awards

College Sports Madness All-American Team

Second Team
Su'a Cravens – LB – Junior

Third Team
Zach Banner – OT –  Junior

USA Today Sports Freshman All-America Team

First Team
Cameron Smith – LB – Freshman
Iman Marshall- CB – Freshman

Pac-12 All-Conference Team

First Team
JuJu Smith-Schuster – WR – Sophomore
Zach Banner – OT –  Junior
Antwaun Woods – DT –  Senior
Su'a Cravens – LB – Junior
Adoree' Jackson – CB – Sophomore

Second Team
Chad Wheeler – OT –  Junior
Delvon Simmons – DE –  Senior
Soma Vainuku – FB –  Senior
Adoree' Jackson – RS – Sophomore

Honorable Mention
Cody Kessler – QB –  Senior
Justin Davis – TB – Junior 
Ronald Jones II – TB – Freshman
Damien Mama – OG – Sophomore
Cameron Smith – LB – Freshman

Pac-12 All-Academic Team

First Team
Robby Kolanz – WR –  Junior
Connor Spears – TE –  Sophomore

Honorable Mention
Alex Wood – K –  Junior

Pac-12 Freshman

Defensive Player of the Year
Cameron Smith – LB – Freshman

Notes
 March 23, 2015 – Former Oklahoma tight end Tyler McNamara Transferring to USC.
 May 1, 2015 – Former SC Linebacker Charles Burks transferring to Azusa Pacific
 June 24, 2015 – Former Florida Tight end Daniel Imatorbhebhe Transferring to USC.
 July 16, 2015 – Georgia Tech confirms addition of USC transfer Lamont Simmons.
 August 4, 2015 – Rahshead Johnson, former 4-star at USC, transfers to San Jose State.
 August 16, 2015 – Freshman Quarterback Ricky Town has decided to transfer. 
 August 21, 2015 – Arkansas announces they have landed ex-USC QB Ricky Town.
 October 12, 2015 – Steve Sarkisian Fired as USC Football Coach.
 October 12, 2015 – Daelin Hayes De-Commits from USC Football.
 October 13, 2015 – Mique Juarez De-Commits from USC Football.
 October 30, 2015 – Athletic Director Pat Haden resigns from the College Football Playoff Selection Committee
 November 30, 2015 – Clay Helton Hired As USC Football Head Coach.
 December 6, 2015 – USC has confirmed the firing of Justin Wilcox, Keith Heyward, Bob Connelly and Chris Wilson.
 December 13, 2015 – Zach Banner to Return for Senior Season at USC.
 December 16, 2015 – Su'a Cravens Declares for 2016 NFL Draft.
 December 18, 2015 – Tee Martin Promoted To Offensive Coordinator.
 December 22, 2015 – Cody Kessler, Soma Vainuku To Play In Senior Bowl.
 December 22, 2015 – Antwaun Woods, Greg Townsend Jr. To Play In 2016 NFLPA Collegiate Bowl.

References

USC
USC Trojans football seasons
USC Trojans football